In Canada, federal budgets are presented annually by the Government of Canada to identify planned government spending and expected government revenue, and to forecast economic conditions for the upcoming year. They are usually released in February or March, before the start of the fiscal year.

All the Canadian provinces also present budgets. Since provincial finances depend on funds from the federal government, they are usually released after the federal budget.

Budget process 
The budget is announced in the House of Commons by the Minister of Finance, who traditionally wears new shoes while doing so. The Budget is then voted on by the House of Commons.  Budgets are a confidence measure, and if the House votes against it the government can fall, as happened to Prime Minister Joe Clark's government in 1980.  The governing party strictly enforces party discipline, usually expelling from the party caucus any government Member of Parliament (MP) who votes against the budget.  Opposition parties almost always vote against the budget.  In cases of minority government, the government has normally had to include major concessions to one of the smaller parties to ensure passage of the budget.

Historically the official opposition used to prepare a complete alternative budget and present this alternative to the Canadian people along with the main budget.  In recent years, opposition parties are more likely to pick only certain aspects to criticize.  The Reform Party revived this practice for a time, however. A complete alternative budget is today produced each year by the Canadian Centre for Policy Alternatives, a non-partisan think-tank.

Traditionally, the budget process was immensely secretive with little consultation.  Under Prime Minister Louis St. Laurent, the Finance Minister famously would type the entire budget himself so that no secretary could read it.  This secrecy was felt to be needed for inside information could enable individuals to profit from upcoming government decisions.  The secrecy also had a large political component, as it would help undermine the response by the opposition.

Under Prime Minister Jean Chrétien and his Finance Minister Paul Martin, this changed considerably.  Most of the budget would be released well before its announcement, especially any major changes so as to get feedback from the populace and the market.

The process of creating the budget is a complex one which begins within the working ranks for the Federal Government. Each year, the various departments that make up the Government (for example, Health, Transportation, Foreign Affairs, National Defence, Industry, CRA, etc.) submit what are called 'The Main Estimates' to The Treasury Board Secretariat. These documents identify the planned expenditure of each department, linking these proposed expenses to programs, to objectives and ultimately to the priorities of the current ruling Government. The Treasury Board Secretariat combines these budget estimates and compiles an initial proposed budget.  From there, the Cabinet and Prime Minister's Office adjust the budget based on a series of economic, social and political factors. In reality, decisions are usually made with the primary intent of re-election and so often include advantages for key regions and lobby groups.

Following the budget, Parliament (the Canadian Parliament) will pass an Appropriation Act (called the 'Interim Supply') which will allow individual departments to spend 3/12th of their annual budget. (The Government of Canada Fiscal Year runs from April 1 to March 31.) This partial authority enables Parliament to spend more time in examining the Estimates documents. In June, Parliament appropriates the full supply.

Summary of budgets

See also
 Taxation in Canada
 Canadian public debt

International:
 Government budget by country

Notes and references

Notes

References

 
Budget